The Independence of Singapore Agreement 1965 was an agreement between the Government of Malaysia and the Government of Singapore on 7 August 1965 that granted independence to Singapore. The Singapore Act 1966 followed the treaty.  The agreement included a Proclamation on Singapore to be made by Malaysian Prime Minister Tunku Abdul Rahman; a different Proclamation of Singapore was made by Singaporean Prime Minister Lee Kuan Yew. 

As a result of the agreement, Singapore achieved full independence from Malaysia, and within the Commonwealth of Nations, with effect from 9 August 1965.

See also

 Malaysia Agreement was signed on 9 July 1963 at London
 Malaysia Act 1963
 Singapore Act 1966
 United Nations General Assembly Resolution 1514 (XV)
 Succession of states
 Vienna Convention on Succession of States in respect of Treaties

References

Formation of Malaysia
History of Malaysia
1965 establishments in Malaysia
1965 in Malaysia
1965 in Singapore
Malaysia–United Kingdom relations
Singapore–United Kingdom relations
Legal documents
Malaysian monarchy
Treaties concluded in 1965
Treaties entered into force in 1965
Treaties of Malaysia
Treaties of Singapore
Treaties involving territorial changes
Malaysia and the Commonwealth of Nations
Singapore and the Commonwealth of Nations
United Kingdom and the Commonwealth of Nations